ESB Villeneuve-d'Ascq is a French women's basketball club from Villeneuve-d'Ascq playing in the Ligue Féminine de Basketball since 2000.

Honours
 Ligue Féminine
 Winners (1): 2017
 French Cup
 Runner-up (3): 2003, 2008, 2014
 EuroCup Women
 Winners (1): 2015

Roster 2016-2017

Current roster

Famous former players 
  Émilie Gomis
  Vedrana Grgin-Fonseca
  Florence Lepron
  Lætitia Kamba
  Megan Mahoney
  Michaela Moua
 Emma Meeseman
Richmond magat

References 

Villeneuve-d'Ascq
Villeneuve-d'Ascq
Villeneuve-d'Ascq
Basketball teams established in 1987
EuroCup Women-winning clubs